The African Development Perspectives Yearbook is an annual academic journal covering socio-economic trends in Africa. According to its publication program, the yearbook aims to analyse African economic policies on various levels: from local to national, regional, and international level.

External links

African studies journals
Annual journals
Publications established in 1989
English-language journals